Johan Driza (born 20 August 1976 in Vlorë) is an Albanian retired footballer who played for Flamurtari Vlorë, Wacker Burghausen, KF Tirana, Bylis Ballsh, Dinamo Tirana and Teuta Durrës as well as the Albania national team.

International career
He made his debut for Albania in an August 1998 friendly match away against Cyrus and earned a total of 4 caps, scoring no goals. His final international was a February 2000 Malta International Football Tournament match against tournament hosts Malta.

Honours
Kategoria Superiore: 2
 2000, 2002

References

External links
 National Football Teams

1976 births
Living people
Footballers from Vlorë
Albanian footballers
Association football defenders
Albania international footballers
Flamurtari Vlorë players
SV Wacker Burghausen players
KF Tirana players
KF Bylis Ballsh players
FK Dinamo Tirana players
KF Teuta Durrës players
Albanian expatriate footballers
Expatriate footballers in Germany
Albanian expatriate sportspeople in Germany